Steve Laplante (born July 13, 1972) is a Canadian actor and writer from Quebec. He is most noted for his performance as David in the 2022 film Viking, for which he received a Canadian Screen Award nomination for Best Lead Performance in a Film at the 11th Canadian Screen Awards in 2023.

Originally from Drummondville, Quebec, he is a 1996 graduate of the National Theatre School of Canada. He first became widely known for his performance in a stage production of Wajdi Mouawad's play Tideline (Littoral), also later repeating the role in its 2004 film adaptation.

In addition to his acting he has written a number of stage plays, the most noted of which, Le Long de la principale, was a shortlisted nominee for the Governor General's Award for French-language drama at the 2007 Governor General's Awards. The play has also been staged in English as Down the Main Drag.

Filmography

Film

Television

References

External links

1972 births
Living people
21st-century Canadian male actors
21st-century Canadian male writers
21st-century Canadian dramatists and playwrights
Canadian male film actors
Canadian male stage actors
Canadian male television actors
Canadian male dramatists and playwrights
Canadian dramatists and playwrights in French
French Quebecers
People from Drummondville
Male actors from Quebec
Writers from Quebec
National Theatre School of Canada alumni